The 2009 Lenoir–Rhyne Bears football team represented Lenoir–Rhyne University in the 2009 NCAA Division II football season. The Bears offense scored 293 points while the defense allowed 241 points.

Schedule

References

Lenoir-Rhyne
Lenoir–Rhyne Bears football seasons
Lenoir-Rhyne Bears football